John Lupton (8 November 1878–1954) was an English footballer who played in the Football League for Glossop.

References

1878 births
1954 deaths
English footballers
Association football defenders
English Football League players
Glossop North End A.F.C. players